Pleasant Mills may refer to:

 Pleasant Mills, Indiana
 Pleasant Mills, New Jersey, Atlantic County, New Jersey
 Pleasant Mills (Pleasant Mills, New Jersey), listed on the National Register of Historic Places in Atlantic County, New Jersey

See also
 Mount Pleasant Mills, Pennsylvania